Pool B of the 2015 Cricket World Cup took place from 15 February to 15 March 2015. The group consisted of India, Pakistan, United Arab Emirates, Ireland, Zimbabwe, West Indies and South Africa. This phase of the tournament was played as a full round-robin amongst all seven teams, with India, South Africa, Pakistan and West Indies advancing to the quarter-finals.

Standings
  Advanced to knockout stage.

Matches

South Africa vs Zimbabwe

India vs Pakistan

India won the toss and elected to bat. After losing Rohit Sharma (15) in the 8th over, Shikhar Dhawan (73) and Virat Kohli (107) put on a 129 run partnership for the 2nd wicket. After Shikhar Dhawan was run out in the 30th over, Suresh Raina joined Kohli in the middle and put on 110 for the 3rd wicket. India lost five wickets in the last five overs for 27 runs and finished with 300 runs in 50 overs. Sohail Khan was the pick of Pakistani Bowlers with 5/55 from his 10 overs.
Pakistan lost Younis Khan in the 4th over to Mohammed Shami and also lost their next 4 wickets in less than 25 overs. Pakistan Captain Misbah-ul-Haq achieved 76 (84) but Shami took 3 wickets in his 2nd spell and Pakistan lost the match in the 46th over. Virat Kohli was named Man of the Match for his century.

Ireland vs West Indies

The West Indies were put into bat by Ireland, who reduced them to 31/2 and 87/5 before Lendl Simmons and Darren Sammy shared a 154 run partnership. They finished their 50 overs with a score of 304/7. In reply, Ireland made 71 runs before losing their first wicket. Paul Stirling and Ed Joyce made a partnership of 106, before Stirling was dismissed. Niall O'Brien finished 79* from 60 balls, to get Ireland over the line with more than four overs remaining. This was Ireland's fourth World Cup victory over a Test playing side and their third successful chase of 300 or more runs in a World Cup.

United Arab Emirates vs Zimbabwe

Pakistan vs West Indies

India vs South Africa

India got to 307 runs in 50 overs via Dhawan's highest score in ODIs. South Africa kept losing wickets at regular intervals and lost the match by 130 runs. Dhawan was named Man of the Match for his century and two catches.

West Indies vs Zimbabwe

Ireland vs United Arab Emirates

South Africa vs West Indies

India vs United Arab Emirates

Pakistan vs Zimbabwe

Ireland vs South Africa

Pakistan vs United Arab Emirates

India vs West Indies

Pakistan vs South Africa

Ireland vs Zimbabwe

India vs Ireland

South Africa vs United Arab Emirates

India vs Zimbabwe

United Arab Emirates vs West Indies

Ireland vs Pakistan

This was Pakistan's highest opening first wicket stand in the tournament. The pair of Ahmad Shahzad and Sarfraz Ahmad put a first-wicket partnership of over 100 runs, with Sarfraz scoring 101 not out, and becoming man of the match in the two consecutive games he played. While Ahmad Shahzad scored 63 runs, ensuring Pakistan a spot in the quarter-finals to face Australia at the same ground.

References

Group B, 2015 Cricket World Cup